is Yellow Magic Orchestra's first live album, released on February 21, 1980.
It was their second number-one album in Japan, setting a record of 250,000 copies sold within two weeks of release.

It was recorded during three dates of the group's first tour of Europe and the US. The group toured as a six-piece, but guitarist Kazumi Watanabe was mixed-out and replaced with more keyboards due to contractual matters between record labels. Un-dubbed recordings from this tour were later released on the album Faker Holic. Most of Yukihiro Takahashi's vocals were also replaced with those re-recorded afterward in studio. These were not restored on Faker Holic.

The first half of the album was recorded live at The Venue in London. "Cosmic Surfin'" was recorded at The Greek Theatre in Los Angeles while the second side was recorded at The Bottom Line in New York City by John Venable using the 2nd Generation Record Plant Remote Truck.

Track listing

Personnel
Yellow Magic Orchestra – arrangements, electronics, mixing engineers, producers
Haruomi Hosono – bass guitar, synth bass
Ryuichi Sakamoto – keyboards, vocoder, drum machine
Yukihiro Takahashi – drums, electronic drums, vocals

Guest musicians
Hideki Matsutake – modular synthesizers, sequencers, programming
Akiko Yano – keyboards, backing vocals
Tomoko Nunoi (uncredited) – French narration/sexy voice (sampled) on "La femme chinoise"

Staff
Kunihiko Murai and Shōrō Kawazoe – executive producers
Norio Yoshizawa – recording and mixing engineer
Mitsuo Koike – recording engineer
Masayoshi Sukita – photography
Heikichi Harata (WXY, Inc.) – artwork
Lou Beach (uncredited) – logo type

References

1980 live albums
Albums recorded at the Bottom Line
Yellow Magic Orchestra albums
Alfa Records live albums
Albums recorded at Nakano Sun Plaza